ET Virginis is a single, red-hued star in the equatorial constellation of Virgo. It can be viewed with the naked eye, having an apparent visual magnitude of 4.91. It is moving further from the Earth with a heliocentric radial velocity of +18.6 km/s, having come within  of the Sun around 6.3 million years ago.

This is an evolved red giant star with a stellar classification of M2 IIIa. It is a semiregular variable star of subtype SRB with a magnitude that ranges from a high of 4.80 down to 5.00. At its estimated distance, this yields a physical size of 83 times the radius of the Sun.

References

M-type giants
Semiregular variable stars
Virgo (constellation)
Durchmusterung objects
123934
069269
5301
Virginis, ET